Owghan may refer to:
 Owghan, East Azerbaijan (اوغان - Owghān)
 Owghan, South Khorasan
 Owghan, West Azerbaijan (اوغن - Owghan)